The Echo is a weekly newspaper founded in 1985 and delivered every Saturday in the eastern suburbs of Perth, Western Australia.

The paper has a circulation of 64, 063 and covers the City of Swan and the Perth Hills, including the Shire of Mundaring and the City of Kalamunda.

References

Publications established in 1985
Newspapers published in Perth, Western Australia
1985 establishments in Australia